Zoufftgen is a commune in the Moselle department in Grand Est in north-eastern France.

Population

2006 rail crash

On the morning of 11 October 2006 a passenger train and a goods train collided head-on, killing six people.

See also
 Communes of the Moselle department

References

External links
 

Communes of Moselle (department)